Sarah Poewe (born 3 March 1983) is an Olympic breaststroke swimmer who has competed internationally for both South Africa and Germany.

Poewe was born in Cape Town, South Africa, the daughter of Lorrain (née Stoch) and Reinhardt Poewe. She lives in Wuppertal, Germany. Her mother is from a Jewish family in South Africa, and her father is German.

At the age of 14, she made her international debut at the 1997 Pan Pacific Championships. Poewe was the voted the Best Female Swimmer in the 1998 Junior Olympics in Moscow. She won the Hungarian National Championships in 100-meter breaststroke 23 June 1999. When she was 17, Poewe competed for the South African swimming team in three events at the 2000 Olympic Games, and finished in fourth place in the women's 100 m breaststroke.

In 2001, Poewe won the South African National Championships in the 100-meter breaststroke. At the 2001 World Championships, Poewe finished fourth in the 100-meter breaststroke.

Poewe represented Germany in the 2004 Olympics, where she was part of the team that won the bronze medal in the women's 4 × 100 m medley. She also represented Germany at the 2008 and 2012 Summer Olympics.
In Beijing 2008, she swam in the 100m and 200m breaststroke and the  medley but didn't medal in any race. In London 2012, Poewe swam in the 100m breaststroke and the  medley, and again didn't medal in either race. She placed 9th in the  medleys for the 2008 and 2012 Summer Olympics.

See also

List of select Jewish swimmers
Georgia Bulldogs

References

External links
Official website

Living people
1983 births
African Games medalists in swimming
African Games silver medalists for South Africa
Commonwealth Games bronze medallists for South Africa
Commonwealth Games medallists in swimming
Commonwealth Games silver medallists for South Africa
Competitors at the 1999 All-Africa Games
European Aquatics Championships medalists in swimming
Female breaststroke swimmers
Georgia Bulldogs women's swimmers
German female swimmers
Jewish South African sportspeople
Jewish swimmers
Medalists at the 2004 Summer Olympics
Medalists at the FINA World Swimming Championships (25 m)
Olympic bronze medalists for Germany
Olympic bronze medalists in swimming
Olympic swimmers of Germany
Olympic swimmers of South Africa
Recipients of the Order of Merit of Berlin
South African expatriate sportspeople in Germany
South African female swimmers
South African people of German descent
Sportspeople from Cape Town
Swimmers at the 2002 Commonwealth Games
Swimmers at the 2000 Summer Olympics
Swimmers at the 2004 Summer Olympics
Swimmers at the 2008 Summer Olympics
Swimmers at the 2012 Summer Olympics
World Aquatics Championships medalists in swimming
Medallists at the 2002 Commonwealth Games